The British Virgin Islands records in swimming are the fastest ever performances of swimmers from British Virgin Islands, which are recognised and ratified by the British Virgin Islands Swimming Association.

All records were set in finals unless noted otherwise.

Long Course (50 m)

Men

Women

Short Course (25 m)

Men

Women

References

British Virgin Islands
Records
Swimming